The Albu Salih tribe is an original Arabic tribe that descends from the Shammar tribe, through the Abda tribe. They are located in Iraq, Kuwait and Saudi Arabia. Albu Salih are concentrated in Al'Aslah, a village in the province of Dhi Qar; they can also be found in Amarah, AlBasra, and Al Diwaniyah.

The population of this tribe is approximately 800,000 people and consists of clans from other tribes. The two main clans in this tribe, Al Rumaieth and Al Nassrallah, both descend from Shammar tribe through Abda. Albu Salih's president is Sheikh Sabah bin Faris bin Mohsen bin Bader Al Rumaidh. Sheikh Sabah resides in Dhi Qar, Iraq.

Sheikh Bader Al Rumaidh, great-grandfather of Sheikh Sabah, was well known for his generosity and his concern for his people. Sheikh Bader Al Rumaidh also showed great courage and bravery during the British occupation of southern Iraq in the 1920s. He, along with other tribes, managed to lead his people in the resistance until they had pushed the British out of their tribal land. Sheikh Bader Al Rumaidh died in 1943, after when his son Sheikh Mohsin took over the leadership of Albu Salih tribe.

Main Sections 

Al Rumaidh (الرميض) - Sheikh Sabah Faris Mohsin Al Rumaidh
Al Omar (ال عمر) - Sheikh Hamid Al Mohsin Al Shabeeb
Al Akhlawi (الاخلوي) - Sheikh Hatem Tahir Al Akhlawi

Albu Salih appellation 

A person belonging to the Albu Salih tribe will go by the last name Al Salihiy (Also spelt Al Salihi, Alsalahi, and Alsalhi). However, traditionally Arabs tend to go by their first name followed by their father's name then their grandfather's name and so on.

References 

 Iraqi tribes (https://web.archive.org/web/20070826231729/http://www.ahraraliraq.net/main/ashair/ashaier%203.htm)
 Al Aslam (www.shammar.net)
 Tribes of Iraq (www.alforat.org)

Tribes of Iraq